Nyctemera dentifascia is a moth of the family Erebidae first described by Snellen in 1898. It is found on Sumatra.

References

Nyctemerina
Moths described in 1898